Connor Byrne (born 18 March 1964) is an Irish actor and former dancer, known for his role as Mike Milligan in The Story of Tracy Beaker, Tracy Beaker Returns and The Dumping Ground. Having played the role from 2002 to 2019, he is the longest serving cast member in the franchise.

Career
Before Byrne entered into the acting world, he danced with companies around the world. He first performed in the West End Theater. Byrne's first acting role was as Dan in a 1991 television production of Joseph and the Amazing Technicolour Dreamcoat. His first main role was as Rob “Hyper” Sharpe in London's Burning, a role he played for two years. Byrne is known for portraying the role of Mike Milligan in the Tracy Beaker franchise. Having portrayed the role of Mike from 2002 to 2019, he is the longest serving character in the franchise.

Filmography

References

External links

1964 births
20th-century Irish male actors
21st-century Irish male actors
Irish male actors
Living people
Male actors from Limerick (city)
Irish male film actors
Irish male television actors
Irish male video game actors